István Kövesfalvi (born 5 December 1968 in Budapest) is a retired Hungarian football player who is currently the goalkeeping coach of Egri FC.

External links
http://www.UEFA.com/
Ujpest FC official website

1968 births
Living people
Hungarian footballers
Footballers from Budapest
Újpest FC players
Debreceni VSC players
Association football goalkeepers
Egri FC players
21st-century Hungarian people